SS York was a small steamer that was used to haul freight on Okanagan Lake and Skaha Lake. York was built in 1902 by Bertram Iron Works of Toronto and assembled at Okanagan Landing. She was pre-fabricated with a steel hull and was twin-screw-driven. She was a small vessel in comparison to the many other ships on the lake; York was only 88 by 16 feet (27 by 4.9 metres). York was capable of moving 134 tons in freight and could carry up to 90 passengers.

Purpose
York was originally built to replace SS Victoria on Trout Lake in the Kootenays; however, SS Aberdeen was in need of a relief vessel. Aberdeen was in dire need of a refitting, hence York was launched on Lake Okanagan in 1902. After Aberdeen returned to Lake Okanagan, York provided way point service(service to location when called in)(online ref.) and worked as a tug boat, carrying cargo that had been clustered on the deck of Aberdeen. Although York was not intended to work as a tugboat, it pushed and pulled barges on Lake Okanagan during fruit season to move perishables to Okanagan Landing so they could be readied for shipment to markets.  During the winter when the lake would freeze, York was used to break the ice for larger ships such as Aberdeen.

York worked on Okanagan Lake until 1921, when she was relocated to Skaha Lake (Dog Lake), where York transported passengers on Skaha Lake and up the river channel in Penticton.  Traveling up and down the channel was tedious and York frequently got stuck in sandbars. York retired when the railway between Penticton and Okanagan falls was complete, after which she was sold to Sid Leary (never put back into service) and eventually dismantled.

Operation

York was launched in 1902 by the Canadian Pacific. York was only in service for thirty years, from 1902 to 1931. She worked on Lake Okanagan as a tugboat until 1921, when York was moved from Okanagan Lake to Skaha Lake. In 1931, she retired and was sold to a Sid Leary from Naramata. She was later dismantled and used for scrap.

Officer and crew complement 
York was a comparatively small vessel, with two decks and a pilot house. The pilot house was the area from which the captain would steer the boat. York was a twin screw vessel, which means that the vessel had two propellers. Additionally, York had a tunnel hull, and the shallow hull allowed York to travel along the channel between Penticton and Skaha Lake.

Throughout her career, York had many different people working aboard her. From 1904 to 1907, the captain of the ship was Captain J. Weeks, who had just earned his Master’s Certificate. This was Weeks’ first captain job. He would later go on to become the captain of Aberdeen and Sicamous, in that order. In 1913, according to Canadian Railway and Marine World, York was captained by M. Reid, and her chief engineer was A. McLena.

Comparison

York was not a luxurious passenger ship like Aberdeen, but she could carry up to 90 passengers.  She did not have many decks, but only what was necessary for her basic operation. York was a small, modest ship that was useful to serve the smaller communities, particularly on Skaha Lake, but was too small and slow to replace Aberdeen. She also lacked the power to act as a proper tugboat on Lake Okanagan. Although she was small, her size was advantageous when working on Skaha Lake and traveling up the channel.

References

1902 ships
Steamboats of British Columbia
Ships built in Ontario
Steamboats of Okanagan Lake